Acne with facial edema  occurs uncommonly, and is associated with a peculiar inflammatory edema of the mid-third of the face.

See also 
 List of cutaneous conditions

References 

Acneiform eruptions
Face